Bolwarra Heights is a suburb in the City of Maitland in the Hunter Region of New South Wales, Australia. Mainly a residential suburb, Bolwarra Heights is bordered to the east by Largs. The traditional owners and custodians of the Maitland area are the Wonnarua people.

The present day suburb of Bolwarra Heights is situated on land originally granted to Scottish settler George Lang by Governor Macquarie in 1822. The Lang family home, historic Dunmore House is a heritage-listed Georgian style homestead built using convict labour in the 1830s, located on the road between Bolwarra Heights and the nearby village of Woodville.

Heritage listings
Bolwarra Heights has a number of heritage-listed sites, including:
 557 Paterson Road: Dunmore House

References

Suburbs of Maitland, New South Wales